A smurf is a fictional, tiny, blue humanoid from The Smurfs, created by Belgian cartoonist Peyo in 1957.

Smurf, SMURF or smurfing may also refer to:

Arts, entertainment, and media

The Smurfs franchise
 Smurf (Smurf language), an undefinable word and derivatives (including "smurfing") used as both verb and noun within the fictional Smurfs franchise
 Smurfette, a female character from The Smurfs
 The Smurfs (comics), Belgian comic series, created by Peyo
 The Smurfs (film), a 2011 film directed by Raja Gosnell, based on the comic franchise
 The Smurfs (1981 TV series), a 1981–1989 American-Belgian animated TV series that aired on NBC, based on the comic franchise
 The Smurfs (2021 TV series), a 2021 animated television series, based on the comic franchise
 The Smurfs (video game), a 2011 video game
 The Smurfs merchandising
 The Smurfs music

Other uses in arts, entertainment, and media
 Janine "Smurf" Cody, a fictional character played by Jacki Weaver in the 2010 Australian film Animal Kingdom and by Ellen Barkin in the USA TV series
 Smurfing or twinking, in video gaming, the act of a high-skilled gamer playing within a lower-level character or competitive bracket. Smurfing is also used to describe a player pretending to be another player by using their account, usually for a competitive advantage or to get around a ban on the smurfing player.
 The Smurf (dance), a 1980s dance fad
 "The Smurf", a single by Tyrone Brunson
 The Smurfs, a rap band with Bernard Fowler

Science and technology
 Smurf attack, a type of denial of service (DoS) attack on computer networks
 SMURF1, an enzyme that in humans is encoded by the SMURF1 gene
 SMURF2, an enzyme that in humans is encoded by the SMURF2 gene
 SMURFs, smartphone spyware by GCHQ and the NSA in their WARRIOR PRIDE kit
 Stepped-frequency microwave radiometer, a microwave radiometer known as "smurf" from its abbreviation SFMR

Other uses 
 Smurfing (financial crime) or "structuring", a term related to money laundering
 Smurfing (methamphetamine production), the hiring of multiple individuals to exceed legal limits for purchase of pseudoephedrine for methamphetamine production
 Smurfs another name for the Australian Association Football team Sydney FC given by rival supporters due to the teams sky blue and white colour scheme.